The Río Nentón is a river in Guatemala.

References

External links
Map of Guatemala including the river

Rivers of Guatemala
Rivers of Mexico
International rivers of North America